A tetralogy (from Greek τετρα- tetra-, "four" and -λογία -logia, "discourse") is a compound work that is made up of four distinct works. The name comes from the Attic theater, in which a tetralogy was a group of three tragedies followed by a satyr play, all by one author, to be played in one sitting at the Dionysia as part of a competition.

Examples

Literature
 Tetrateuch is a sometime name for the first four books of the Bible. The Tetrateuch plus Deuteronomy are collectively referred to as the Pentateuch. 
 Tintitives by Antiphon of Rhamnus; the author was an orator, and Tintitives is a kind of textbook for students. Each book consists of four speeches: the prosecutor's opening speech, the first speech for the defense, the prosecutor's reply, and the defendant's conclusion. Three of his tetralogies are known to have survived.
 The traditional arrangement of the works of Plato into nine tetralogies, including some doubtful works, and the letters as a single work. 
 The Henriad, two tetralogies of history plays of William Shakespeare. The First Tetralogy in order of composition begins with the three Henry VI plays. The Second Tetralogy finishes with the history of Henry V.

Modern

Films
 The Avengers (2012, 2015, 2018, 2019)
 Captain America (2011, 2014, 2016, 2024)
 Thor (2011, 2013, 2017, 2022)
 Batman (1989, 1992, 1995, 1997)
 Diary of a Wimpy Kid (2010, 2011, 2012, 2017)
 Insidious (2010, 2013, 2015, 2018)
 Ip Man (2008, 2010, 2015, 2019)
 Jaws (1975, 1978, 1983, 1987)
 John Wick (2014, 2017, 2019, 2023)
 Mad Max (1979, 1981, 1985, 2015)
 My Little Pony: Equestria Girls (2013, 2014, 2015, 2016)
 Men in Black (1997, 2002, 2012, 2019)
 Night at the Museum (2006, 2009, 2014, 2022)
 Rebuild of Evangelion (2007, 2009, 2012, 2021)
 Rec (2007, 2009, 2012, 2014)
 Spy Kids (2001, 2002, 2003, 2011)
 The Crow (1994, 1996, 2000, 2005)
 The Hunger Games (2012, 2013, 2014, 2015)
 The Matrix (1999, 2003, 2003, 2021)
 Superman (1978, 1980, 1983, 1987)
 Alvin and the Chipmunks (2007, 2009, 2011, 2015)
 Despicable Me (2010, 2013, 2017, 2024)
 Hotel Transylvania (2012, 2015, 2018, 2022)
 Kung Fu Panda (2008, 2011, 2016, 2024)
 Shrek (2001, 2004, 2007, 2010)
 Toy Story (1995, 1999, 2010, 2019)

Other information
In the early modern period of literature, Shakespeare drafted a pair of tetralogies, the first consisting of the three Henry VI plays and Richard III, and the second, what we now call a prequel because it is set earlier, consisting of Richard II, the two Henry IV plays, and Henry V.

As an alternative to "tetralogy", "quartet" is sometimes used, particularly for series of four books. The term "quadrilogy", using the Latin prefix quadri- instead of the Greek, and first recorded in 1865, has also been used for marketing the Alien movies.

See also

 Sequel
 List of film series with four entries
 Trilogy

References

Tetralogies
Literary tetralogies
Literary series
Film series
Musical forms
Narrative forms